Traditional Ottawa stories fall into two general categories, aasookaan 'legend, sacred story' (plural aasookaanag) and dbaajmowin 'narrative, story' (plural dbaajmownan). Stories in the aasookaan category involve mythical characters such as Nenbozh. Stories in the dbaajmowin category include traditional stories that do not necessarily involve mythical characters, with the same term also used more generally to refer to any type of story not in the aasookaan category. Published Ottawa text material includes a range of genres, including historical narratives, stories of conflict with other indigenous groups, humorous stories, and others.

Text
Ottawa speaker Andrew Medler dictated the following text while he was working with Leonard Bloomfield in a linguistic field methods class at the Linguistic Institute of the Linguistic Society of America, held during the summer of 1938 at the University of Michigan in Ann Arbor, Michigan. Medler grew up near Saginaw, Michigan but spent most of his life at Walpole Island. The texts that Medler dictated were originally published in a linguistically oriented transcription using phonetic symbols, and have been republished in the modern orthography, with analysis.

Love Medicine
Andrew Medler

Analysis of text
Below is an interlinear glossing and analysis of the words in each sentence, with lines of analysis being vertically aligned on a word-by-word basis. For each sentence the first line presents the text, the second presents a morphological analysis, the third line presents a translation of the elements identified in line 2, and the fourth line presents a word-by-word translation. A more detailed morphological analysis is also available. A table of codes for grammatical elements used in interlinear glossing occurs after the glossed sentences.

In the first line the hyphen '-' is used to mark the division between a preverb and an immediately following verb, as in Sentence 1: ngii-noondwaaba 'I heard it,' with past tense preverb gii-; or a preverb followed by another preverb, as in Sentence 5, gaa-zhi-gchi-zaaghaad, where the first two hyphens indicate the boundaries between preverbs, and the third hyphen indicates the boundary between a preverb and a verb. In the second line, where morphological analysis is presented, the hyphen marks the start of a suffix, as in wshkiniigkwe-n 'young.man' followed by Obviative suffix -n. Also in the second line, the marker '=' indicates the boundary between a verb and a following verb or preverb.

Sentence 1

Sentence 2

Sentence 3

Sentence 4

Sentence 5

Sentence 6

Sentence 7

The following table lists codes used in the interlinear analysis of the text.

Notes

References

Bloomfield, Leonard. 1958. Eastern Ojibwa: Grammatical sketch, texts and word list. Ann Arbor: University of Michigan Press.
 Cappel, Constance. (Editor).2006. Odawa Language and Legends: Andrew J. Blackbird and Raymond Kiogima. Bloomington,IN:Xlibris.
 Fox, Francis and Nora Soney with Richard Rhodes. 1988. "Chippewa-Ottawa texts." John Nichols, ed., An Ojibwe text anthology, 33-68. London: The Centre for Teaching and Research of Canadian Native Languages, University of Western Ontario. 
McGregor, Gregor with C. F. Voegelin. 1988. "Birch Island Texts." Edited by Leonard Bloomfield and John D. Nichols. John Nichols, ed., An Ojibwe text anthology, 107-194. London: The Centre for Teaching and Research of Canadian Native Languages, University of Western Ontario. 
Nichols, John D. and Leonard Bloomfield, eds. 1991. The dog's children. Anishinaabe texts told by Angeline Williams. Winnipeg: Publications of the Algonquian Text Society, University of Manitoba. 
 Piggott, Glyne L., ed. 1985. Three stories from the Odawa language project. Algonquian and Iroquoian Linguistics, Readers and Study Guides. Winnipeg: Department of Native Studies, University of Manitoba. 
 Piggott, Glyne L., ed. 1985a. Stories of Sam Osawamick from the Odawa language project. Algonquian and Iroquoian Linguistics, Readers and Study Guides. Winnipeg: Department of Native Studies, University of Manitoba. 
Valentine, J. Randolph. 1998. Weshki-bimaadzijig ji-noondmowaad. 'That the young might hear': The stories of Andrew Medler as recorded by Leonard Bloomfield.  London, ON: The Centre for Teaching and Research of Canadian Native Languages, University of Western Ontario. 
 Wilder, Julie, ed. 1999. Wiigwaaskingaa / Land of birch trees: Ojibwe stories by Arthur J. McGregor. Ojibwe editor Mary E. Wemigwans. Hobbema, AB: Blue Moon Publishing. 

Traditional narratives of indigenous peoples of the Americas
Indigenous languages of the North American eastern woodlands
Indigenous languages of the North American Subarctic
First Nations languages in Canada
Languages of the United States
Anishinaabe languages
Great Lakes tribes
Anishinaabe mythology